Cold Spring is a home rule-class city in Campbell County, Kentucky, in the United States. The population was 5,912 at the 2010 census, up from 3,806 at the 2000 census. It is part of the Cincinnati-Northern Kentucky metropolitan area.

The organization Disabled American Veterans was formerly based in Cold Spring.

Geography
Cold Spring is located in northern Campbell County at  (39.013769, −84.433392). It is bordered to the northwest by Wilder, to the north by Highland Heights, to the northeast by Crestview, to the southeast by Alexandria, and to the southwest by the Licking River, with the city of Taylor Mill in Kenton County on the other side.

U.S. Route 27 passes through Cold Spring as Alexandria Pike, leading northwest  to downtown Cincinnati and southeast  to Alexandria. Kentucky Route 9, a limited-access highway, also passes through Cold Spring, leading northwest to Newport across the Ohio River from Cincinnati, and southeast to Maysville and beyond.

History
The name "Cold Spring" refers to a cold stream which for many years served as the sole source of drinking water. The community was founded prior to 1800, and a post office was established in 1832. It has since merged with the post office of Highland Heights.

Demographics

As of the census of 2000, there were 3,806 people, 1,467 households, and 1,104 families residing in the city. The racial makeup of the city was 98.34% White, 0.42% African American, 0.21% Native American, 0.47% Asian, and 0.55% from two or more races. Hispanic or Latino of any race were 0.32% of the population.

There were 1,467 households, out of which 31.3% had children under the age of 18 living with them, 66.6% were married couples living together, 7.1% had a female householder with no husband present, and 24.7% were non-families. 22.8% of all households were made up of individuals, and 8.0% had someone living alone who was 65 years of age or older. The average household size was 2.59 and the average family size was 3.06.

In the city, the population was spread out, with 24.2% under the age of 18, 7.0% from 18 to 24, 26.8% from 25 to 44, 27.3% from 45 to 64, and 14.8% who were 65 years of age or older. The median age was 41 years. For every 100 females, there were 92.8 males. For every 100 females age 18 and over, there were 87.9 males.

The median income for a household in the city was $58,867, and the median income for a family was $68,125. Males had a median income of $46,875 versus $34,531 for females. The per capita income for the city was $24,451. About 1.0% of families and 1.2% of the population were below the poverty line, including 1.5% of those under age 18 and none of those age 65 or over.

Education
Residents are within the Campbell County School District. Residents are zoned to Campbell County High School in Alexandria.

Cold Spring has a public library, a branch of the Campbell County Public Library.

References

External links
 
 Historical Images and Texts of Cold Spring, Kentucky

Cities in Campbell County, Kentucky
Cities in Kentucky